Gael Mabiala (born 7 June 1994) is a French professional footballer who plays as a defender for USL Championship club Birmingham Legion.

References

External links
Profile at Francis Marion Sports
Profile at UAB Sports

1994 births
Living people
US Feurs players
UAB Blazers men's soccer players
Birmingham Legion FC players
USL League Two players
USL Championship players
French footballers
Association football defenders